Jeff Murray (born 7 April 1952) is a former Australian rules footballer who played for Hawthorn in the Victorian Football League (VFL).

Murray was an established ruckman with Claremont before crossing to Hawthorn and represented Western Australia at the 1975 Knockout Carnival. In 1978, his only VFL season, he shared his debut with Terry Wallace and in total made ten appearances for the seniors. He lost his place in the side on the eve of the finals, with Hawthorn going on to claim the premiership.

References

Holmesby, Russell and Main, Jim (2007). The Encyclopedia of AFL Footballers. 7th ed. Melbourne: Bas Publishing.

1952 births
Living people
Australian rules footballers from Western Australia
Hawthorn Football Club players
Claremont Football Club players